The Treaty of Stralsund, arranged on 12 February 1354, settled border disputes resulting from the wars for Rugian succession between the duchies of Mecklenburg and Pomerania.

See also
Pomerania during the Late Middle Ages

Stralsund
Stralsund
Boundary treaties
Treaties of the Duchy of Pomerania
Stralsund
1354 in Europe